The 1st Battalion, 6th Marines (1/6) is an infantry battalion in the United States Marine Corps based in Camp Lejeune, North Carolina. It consists of approximately 1,100 marines and sailors. They fall under the command of the 6th Marine Regiment, the 2nd Marine Division of the II Marine Expeditionary Force (II MEF).

Subordinate units
 Headquarters and Services Company – "Hawkeye"
 Alpha Company – "Apache"
 Bravo Company – "Black Foot"
 Charlie Company – "Cold Steel"
 Weapons Company – "Warrior"

History

World War I (1917–1919)
Activated on 11 July 1917 at Marine Corps Base Quantico, Virginia, as the 1st Battalion, 6th Marine Regiment. 1/6 deployed to France from September to October 1917 and was assigned to the 4th Brigade, 2nd Division (Army), American Expeditionary Force. For the actions at Belleau Wood, Soissons, and Blanc Mont, the 6th Marine Regiment was awarded the French Croix de Guerre three times. As a result, the regiment is authorized to wear the fourragère of the Croix de Guerre (seen in the unit's logo), one of only two units in the Marine Corps so honored, (the other being the 5th Marine Regiment). The fourragère thereafter became part of the uniform of the unit. All members of the modern 6th Marines are authorized to wear the fourragère while serving with the regiment. (World War One Victory Medal, Army Occupation of Germany Medal, French Croix de guerre)

The battalion participated in the following World War I campaigns:
Aisne
Aisne-Marne
St. Mihiel
Meuse-Argonne

Along with the following defensive campaigns:
Touln-Troyon
Chateau-Thierry
Marabache
Limey

1/6 participated in the Occupation of the Rhineland from December 1918 to July 1919. After the war the battalion relocated to Quantico, Virginia in August 1919 and was deactivated on 20 August 1919.

1922 – 1934
The battalion was reactivated on 12 June 1922 and participated in maneuvers at Gettysburg, Pennsylvania. From June–July 1922, it was assigned to the Marine Corps Expeditionary Force.

In June 1924 1/6 deployed to the Dominican Republic and Guantanamo Bay, Cuba participating in expeditionary operations until September 1925. The unit returned to Norfolk, Virginia, and was deactivated on 1 October 1925. (Marine Corps Expeditionary Medal)

On 29 March 1927, 1/6 was reactivated in Philadelphia, Pennsylvania, in May 1927, 1/6 deployed to Shanghai, China and was assigned to 3rd Brigade. The battalion was again deactivated in March 1929 in San Diego, California

Yangtze River Valley (1934–1938) 
On 9 September 1934, at Norfolk, Virginia, 1/6 relocated to San Diego during September and October 1934 and then deployed to Shanghai in China in August 1937 where it was assigned to the 2nd Marine Brigade, Fleet Marine Force. The battalion returned to San Diego during February to April 1938. (Yangtze Service Medal, China Service Medal)

World War II (1939–1946)
On 1 February 1941, the 2nd Marine Brigade was re-designated as the 2nd Marine Division, Fleet Marine Force (FMF). In anticipation of joining the war 1/6 deployed during May to July 1941 to Reykjavík, Iceland and was reassigned to the 1st Provisional Marine Brigade.

1/6 relocated during March 1942 to San Diego and were reassigned to the 2nd Marine Division, FMF. From October to November 1942 it deployed to Wellington in New Zealand. During the course of World War II the battalion fought at Guadalcanal, Tarawa, Saipan, Tinian and Okinawa.

The 6th Marines landed at Guadalcanal on 4 January 1943 where it was briefly reunited with the 2nd and 8th Marines. The 6th Marines, fighting as part of a temporary Army-Marine division after the bulk of the 2nd Marine Division departed, participated in the final American offensive on Guadalcanal advancing from Kokumbona to Cape Esperance and eliminating the last remaining enemy forces. The 6th Marines suffered 223 casualties (53 killed in action or died of wounds, 170 wounded in action), during its six weeks on the "Canal".

During the Battle of Tarawa, the 6th Marines was the V Amphibious Corps' floating reserve. The assault waves stormed ashore on 20 November 1943 but ran into stiff opposition. Casualties were so heavy that the entire division reserve was committed on the first day. The 6th Marines was ordered ashore the following morning. The 1st and 3rd Battalions landed across Betio's Green Beach and were ordered to drive the length of the island, the 2nd Battalion was used as a blocking force on nearby Bairiki Island. Betio was declared secure after 76 bloody hours. The 1st and 3rd Battalions were re-located to a new rest camp in Hawaii, but the 2nd Battalion stayed on to clear the rest of the atoll. The 6th Marines suffered 355 casualties (99 dead, 256 wounded) and received a Presidential Unit Citation for its actions on Tarawa.

The regiment next participated in the Battle of Saipan and the Tinian operation. The regiment landed under heavy fire at Saipan's Red Beach on 15 June. This was the most difficult assault landing in regimental history; two of the three battalion commanders were seriously wounded in the first minutes ashore. Early the next morning, the 6th Marines repulsed several tank-supported counterattacks that saved the beachhead. Machine gunner PFC Harold G. Epperson sacrificed his own life by diving on a grenade on 25 June and received a posthumous Medal of Honor for that action. The regiment then drove north up the west side of the island through the coastal town of Garapan and on toward Tanapag, where the Marines faced the largest Japanese "Banzai" attack of the war.

The next battle for the regiment was at Tinian on 25 July and joined the rest of the 2nd Marine Division as it elbowed its way down the island until reaching the escarpment that marked Tinian's southern tip on 1 August. It took three days of tough fighting to reduce the final enemy stronghold. During that fighting, PFC Robert L. Wilson covered a live grenade with his body to protect his comrades and earned a posthumous Medal of Honor. The regiment lost 34 killed and 165 wounded in ten days on Tinian.

In September 1945, the unit deployed to Nagasaki where it participated in the Occupation of Japan from September 1945 to June 1946. (Presidential Unit Citation, American Defense Service Medal, European-African-Middle East Campaign Medal, Asiatic-Pacific Campaign Medal, World War II Victory Medal, Navy Occupation Medal)

Cold War (1946–1990)
In July 1946, 1/6 relocated to Camp Pendleton, California and was reassigned to the 3rd Marine Brigade, FMF. In July 1947, it was reassigned to the 1st Marine Division and deactivated on 1 October 1947. On 7 October 1949 1/6 was reactivated at the Marine Corps Base at Camp Lejeune, North Carolina and was assigned to the 2nd Marine Division. Unit personnel subsequently deployed at various times as the Battalion Landing Team 1/6 in Okinawa, the Mediterranean and the Caribbean.

In 1958, 1/6 participated in Operation Blue Bat during the 1958 Lebanon Crisis.(Marine Corps Expeditionary Medal)

In 1962, 1/6 participated in the Cuban Missile Crisis in October and November 1962 (Marine Corps Expeditionary Medal)

In 1965, 1/6 participated in the Intervention in the Dominican Republic from April to June 1965 in support of Operation Powerpack. (Armed Forces Expeditionary Medal)

On 21 April 1967, a military coup overthrew the elected government of Greece. Navy units were immediately alerted and directed to the Ionian Sea. Two Battalion Landing Teams (BLT 3/8, and BLT 1/6) were in the Mediterranean at the time, because of a turn-over; both were active in the operation, which involved a show of force and a contingency (stand-by) evacuation response.

The Six-Day Arab-Israeli War of June 1967 caused the Marine Amphibious Ready Group (BLT 1/6) to be put on alert for possible operations. On 6 June, two carrier task forces moved closer to the fighting, while four days later, President Johnson ordered a high-speed carrier movement toward Syria to facilitate a cease-fire agreement.

On 1 September 1969, a coup overthrew the Libyan monarchy. At the same time, conditions were very unsettled in Lebanon, leading to the 22 October resignation of the Lebanese Prime Minister. Contingency forces in the period 26–30 October included two carrier task forces and the Mediterranean Amphibious Ready Group (MARG) with BLT 1/6 embarked.

In 1983, 1/6 participated as part of the Multinational Peace Keeping Force in Lebanon from February to June 1983 (Armed Forces Expeditionary Medal)*** (Note ***) This is not correct.  From Jan-Jul 1983, 1/6 was deployed to Okinawa, Japan under the Unit Deployment Program.  The Battalion was attached to 4th Marines, 3rd Marine Division. (my source is I was a member of 1/6 from Oct82-Jul85.)

From January to July 1989 elements of Charlie Company 1/6 deployed to Panama with 6th Marine Regiment in support of Operation Just Cause. (Navy Unit Commendation, Armed Forces Expeditionary Medal, Multinational Force and Observers Medal)

(National Defense Service Medals awarded for active duty service during Korean War 27 June 1950 to 27 July 1954 and war Vietnam War 1 January 1961 to 14 August 1974, Navy Unit Commendation awarded 1986–1987, Sea Service Deployment Ribbons Awarded for deployments for a period of either 90 consecutive days or two periods of at least 80 days each within a given 12-month period; or 6 months stationed overseas in a forward deployed location, 15 August 1974– Present)

Persian Gulf War (1990–1991) 
The battalion participated in Operation Desert Shield and Operation Desert Storm in 1991. The battalion was already deployed to Okinawa since July 1990, then on to Saudi Arabia via amphibious ships with the 4th MEB. After extensive training and attaching to the 2nd Marine Division upon their arrival in December, they were ready to fight. The battalion provided valuable information to the Division since they had been in country since September and was pleased to rejoin their higher command, the 6th Marine Regt. The 6th Marines was commanded by Col Lawrence H. "Rhino 6" Livingston, a highly decorated Vietnam Veteran, winning the Navy Cross, Silver Star, four Bronze stars and five purple hearts respectively. Lt Col Thomas S. Jones, who command 1/6 was a decorated combat veteran of Vietnam himself and had served an exchange tour with the 42 Commando British Royal Marines, was well suited for the task at hand. He was well respected throughout the battalion and the Regiment as well. At 0600 on 24, 1/6 February quickly closed on the first of the obstacle belts which consisted of two minefield and wire obstacles. The Combat Engineer Battalion opened the lanes using the mine clearing line charges and then mine plows as best as they could. Various types of mines were encountered, but were expected. Plastic antipersonnel and antitank mines would slide back into the lanes as the AAVs with infantry Marines inside and the CAAT teams advanced to the objective. Under indirect and direct fire from the enemy, the battalion fought through two mine fields and also had to quickly go to MOPP level 4, responding to the alarm of chemical agent of "mustard gas" detected by the "Fox" chemical reconnaissance vehicle. After the first day of fighting, hundreds of Iraqis on the front line surrendered, many of them had to be "convinced" to give up the fight or die. Along with the Army's Tiger Brigade (Tanks), 1st Battalion, 6th Marines destroyed many enemy tanks, armored personnel carriers, bunkers, and enemy ground troops who did not understand the fact that, Marines take the fight to the enemy, hard and heavy. (Navy Unit Commendation, National Defense Service Medal, Southwest Asian Service, Kuwait Liberation Medal Kuwait, Kuwait Liberation Medal Saudi Arabia)

Operation Sea Signal (1994) 
From July 1994 to October 1994 under Joint Task Force 160, 1/6 participated in Operation Sea Signal a United States Military humanitarian operation in the Caribbean in response to an influx of Cuban and Haitian migrants attempting to gain asylum in the United States. (Joint Meritorious Unit Award, Humanitarian Service Medal)

Operation Pacific Haven (1996-1997) 
While on a six-month deployment to Okinawa, Japan elements of 1st Battalion 6th Marines were called upon to support the Ground Combat Element, Marine Component, Joint Task Force (JTF) Pacific Haven on the island of Guam. Operation Pacific Haven was activated in September 1996 to provide humanitarian assistance to over 2,500 Kurds evacuated from Northern Iraq seeking asylum and eventual entry into the U.S. From 2 December 1996 to 19 March 1997, Bravo Company 1/6 was assigned to the Tiyan housing area in Guam to provide security and support the overflow of Kurdish evacuees.  (Joint Meritorious Unit Award, Humanitarian Service Medal)

Kosovo Campaign (1999) 
1st Battalion 6th Marines participated in Operation Noble Anvil in Kosovo from January to April 1999. Also known as the NATO bombing of Yugoslavia or Operation Allied Force, the bombing killed around 1,000 members of the Yugoslav security forces. It destroyed bridges, industrial plants, barracks and military installations. Throughout the air campaign, 1/6 attached to the 24th Marine Expeditionary Unit was poised in the Aegean and Adriatic Seas to conduct Tactical Recovery of Aircraft and Personnel (TRAP) missions in support of combat operations had U.S. or NATO aircrews required assistance. While in the Aegean, 1/6 participated in humanitarian assistance efforts in the former Yugoslav Republic of Macedonia to assist Kosovar refugees with food, water, shelter and medical aid. In the days after the Yugoslav army withdrew, over 164,000 Serbs and 24,000 Roma left Kosovo and many of the remaining non-Albanian civilians (as well as Albanians perceived as collaborators) were victims of abuse which included beatings, abductions, and murders. (Navy Unit Commendation, Kosovo Campaign Medal, NATO Medal Kosovo)

Global War on Terrorism (2001–Present)

(National Defense Service Medal and Global War on Terrorism Service awarded for active service during Global War on Terrorism from 11 September 2001 to Present)

In 2004, 1st Battalion 6th Marines deployed as the ground combat element of the 22nd Marine Expeditionary Unit to Oruzgan Province in Afghanistan in support of Operation Enduring Freedom. (Navy Unit Commendation, Afghanistan Campaign Medal, NATO Medal ISAF)

In 2005, 1/6 deployed to Fallujah, Iraq in support of Operation Iraqi Freedom. (Iraq Campaign Medal)

In 2006–2007 1/6 deployed to Ar Ramadi, Iraq, where they participated in the Battle of Ramadi. (Navy Unit Commendation, Iraq Campaign Medal)

In 2007, 1/6 became Battalion Landing Team 1/6, attached to the 24th Marine Expeditionary Unit and provided reserve support in 5th and 6th Fleet for Operations Iraqi Freedom and Operation Enduring Freedom. (Global War on Terrorism Expeditionary Medal)

In 2008, 1/6 deployed to Helmand Province in Afghanistan between February and September in support of Operation Enduring Freedom. During its tasking, the battalion reinforced British and Afghan forces in the Helmand Province campaign. Most combat operations took place in the Taliban-held town of Garmsir. (Meritorious Unit Commendation, Afghanistan Campaign Medal, NATO Medal ISAF)

In December 2009 1/6 deployed again to Afghanistan in support of Operation Enduring Freedom. This was part of the 20,000-troop increase approved just a week before by President Barack Obama, originally ordered by George W. Bush. On 13 February 2010, 1/6 took part in the invasion of Marjah in Helmand Province, known as Operation Moshtarak, and was the first Afghan-led operation of the war. The invasion began with members of Alpha and Bravo companies inserting via CH-53 Super Stallion helicopters with approximately 300 Marines and Afghan soldiers and Charlie company using mobile forces to clear and hold a major portion of the city. By 14 June 2010, 1/6's advanced party had returned to the US and by late July the entire battalion was back from the deployment. (Presidential Unit Citation, Navy Unit Commendation, Afghanistan Campaign Medal, NATO Medal ISAF)

In 2011, 1/6 again deployed to Helmand Province and engaged in Operation Eastern Storm, in an effort to clear Sangin and Kajaki Districts of Taliban insurgents, while Charlie Company supported 3rd Battalion 6th Marines in the Marjah district of Afghanistan. (Afghanistan Campaign Medal, NATO Medal ISAF)

In 2014 1/6 deployed as the ground element of the 22nd Marine Expeditionary Unit as the Bataan Amphibious Ready Group (BATARG) located in the 5th and 6th Fleet in support of Operation Inherent Resolve and the evacuation of the US embassy in Tripoli by 3rd Battalion 8th Marines(Operation Oaken Lotus). After the evacuation of the US embassy in Tripoli the 22nd Marine Expeditionary Unit’s deployment was extended to support ongoing operations in Iraq, and Syria. Detachments of Marines were sent to Iraq to reinforce the US embassy in Baghdad, and support special operations forces in Kurdistan.(Navy Unit Commendation, Global War on Terrorism Expeditionary Medal)

In 2015, 1/6 participated in BALTOPS (Baltic Operations), an annual exercise with allied NATO forces in Poland, Sweden, Germany, and the Baltic States.

Operation Odyssey Lightning: In 2016, 1st Battalion 6th Marines deployed as the ground combat element of the 22nd Marine Expeditionary Unit. Before joining the operation in Libya, elements of 1/6 aboard the USS San Antonio came under attack as it moved through the Bab al-Mandeb strait on the southern end of the Red Sea while conducting operations in support of Operation Enduring Freedom-Horn of Africa, Operation Restoring Hope, and Operation Oaken Steel. Shortly after the attacks, the  destroyed three radar sites in Yemen in retaliation for the two separate attacks on U.S. ships in the Red Sea. This was credited as the first surface naval battle since the Persian Gulf War. Members of the 22nd MEU received the Presidential Unit Citation and Combat Action Ribbons for operations in Libya and Yemen. (Meritorious Unit Commendation, Global War on Terrorism Expeditionary Medal)

Operation Inherent Resolve: In September 2017 elements of 1st Battalion 6th Marines deployed to Syria with 1st Battalion 10th Marines as a part of Combined Joint Task Force-Operation Inherent Resolve in order to support operations against ISIS militants in the Battle of Raqqa. (Joint Meritorious Unit Commendation, Navy Unit Commendation, Inherent Resolve Campaign Medal)

In 2018, 1/6 deployed as part of the Black Sea Rotational Force (18.1) postured in Mihail Kogălniceanu Air Base, Romania, which enabled the continuation of promoting regional stability, and building and maintaining enduring partnerships with allied and partner nations. 1/6 also sent Marines to Norway to train with allied NATO forces for a potential cold-weather fight with North Korea or Russia. Upon completion of their training the Marines of 1/6 had their deployment extended due to Hurricane Florence preventing them from returning to Camp Lejeune on schedule. (Navy Arctic Service Ribbon)

In 2020, 1st Battalion, 6th Marine Regiment deployed under the Unit Deployment Program to Camp Schwab, Okinawa, Japan under 3rd Marine Division.

In 2021, 1st Battalion, 6th Marine Regiment participated in Exercise Sea Breeze 2021 a multinational maritime exercise, involving sea, land, and air components, and is co-hosted by the United States and Ukraine to enhance interoperability and capability among participating forces in the Black Sea region.

On August 18, 2021; Bravo Company and other elements from the 1st Battalion, 6th Marine Regiment deployed aboard the USS Arlington (LPD 24) in U.S. 4th Fleet area of operations off the coast of Haiti in support of Joint Task Force-Haiti, following a 7.2-magnitude earthquake that struck Haiti on August 14. They returned on September 6. (Humanitarian Service Medal)

Honors and awards
The 1st Battalion 6th Marines has been awarded the following:
  Presidential Unit Citation Streamer with Bronze star
 World War II Tarawa – 1943
Afghanistan 2009–2010
  Joint Meritorious Unit Award
Operation Sea Signal
Operation Pacific Haven
Operation Inherent Resolve 2017
  Navy Unit Commendation Streamer with Silver Star and Bronze Star
 Panama – 1989
Southwest Asia – 1990–1991
Kosovo – 1999
Afghanistan – 2004, 2010
Iraq – 2006 – 2007
BLT 1/6 2014
OIR 1/6 C - 2017
  Navy Meritorious Unit Commendation Streamer with Bronze Star
1986–1987
Afghanistan 2008
BLT 1/6 2016
1/6 UDP 2020
  World War I Victory Streamer with five Bronze Stars
  Army of Occupation of Germany streamer
  Yangtze Service Streamer
  China Service Streamer
  Marine Corps Expeditionary Streamer with two Bronze Stars
  American Defense Service Streamer with one Bronze Star
  European – African – Middle Eastern Campaign Streamer
  Asiatic – Pacific Campaign Streamer with one Silver And One Bronze Star
  World War II Victory Streamer
  Navy Occupation Service Streamer With "Asia" And "Europe"
  National Defense Service Streamer with three Bronze Stars
  Armed Forces Expeditionary Streamer With one Bronze star
  South West Asia Service Streamer with two Bronze Stars
 Kosovo Campaign Streamer with on Bronze Star
 Global War on Terrorism Service Streamer
 Afghanistan Campaign Streamer with three Bronze Stars
 Iraq Campaign Streamer with three Bronze Stars
 Global War on Terrorism Expeditionary Streamer
 Inherent Resolve Campaign Streamer
  French Croix de guerre With Two Palms And One Gilt star, allowing the members to wear a Croix de guerre Fourragère.

See also 

Organization of the United States Marine Corps
List of United States Marine Corps battalions
The Battle for Marjah
Operation Asbury Park

Notes

References

Bibliography

Web

 1/6's official website

Infantry battalions of the United States Marine Corps